Adder may refer to:

 AA-12 Adder, a Russian air-to-air missile
 Adder (electronics), an electronic circuit designed to do addition
 Adder Technology, a manufacturing company
 Armstrong Siddeley Adder, a late 1940s British turbojet engine
 Blackadder, a series of BBC sitcoms
 Golden Axe: The Revenge of Death Adder, a video game
 HMS Adder, any of seven ships of the Royal Navy
 Any of several groups of venomous snakes
 Common European adder, found in Europe and northern Asia
 USS Adder, a US submarine

See also 
 Addition, a mathematical operation